Swoszowice may refer to the following places in Poland:
Swoszowice, Kraków
Swoszowice, Kazimierza County